The Xiamen Sports Centre Stadium is a multi-use stadium in Xiamen, China. It is currently used mostly for football matches and athletics events. The stadium has a capacity of 32,000 people, and was the home of Xiamen Blue Lions.

References

Buildings and structures in Xiamen
Football venues in China
Sport in Xiamen
Sports venues in Fujian